General Arenales Partido  is a  partido on the northern border of Buenos Aires Province in Argentina.

Economy
The economy of General Arenales Partido is dominated by agriculture. The main products are arable crops, beef, pork, honey and dairy products.

There are also small scale metal and textile industries as well as numerous small businesses.

Settlements
General Arenales
Arribeños
Ascensión
Delgado

Ham
La Angelita
La Pinta
La Trinidad

References

External links

 
 Arenales Partido
 Travel Net site

1889 establishments in Argentina
Partidos of Buenos Aires Province